In Microsoft Windows system administration, a Uniqueness Database File (UDF) is a text file that enables the administrator to supply the information that must be unique to each computer or each user. Used in conjunction with a single answer file, when Windows XP Professional is deployed to several client computers that require different setup configurations.

External links 
 http://www.microsoft.com/technet/archive/ntwrkstn/reskit/dep02.mspx?mfr=true

Windows architecture